Vignesh Dakshinamurthy (born 5 March 1998) is an Indian professional footballer who plays as a left back or midfielder for Indian Super League club Mumbai City and the India national team.

Club career
Born in Srirampura, Karnataka, Dakshinamurthy started his career with Ozone academy before being promoted to their first-team and playing for them in the I-League 2nd Division.

Mumbai City
On 8 September 2018, it was announced that Dakshinamurthy signed with Indian Super League side Mumbai City.
On 20 December 2020, Vignesh scored his first goal in Indian Super League as well as for Mumbai City against Hyderabad in which he found the net in the 38th minute as Mumbai City won for 2–0. In April 2022, he was included in the club's 2022 AFC Champions League squad.

International career
Dakshinamurthy previously represented India at the under-20 and under-17 levels.

On 15 July 2018, Dakshinamurthy was called-up by Stephen Constantine to the India senior side as they prepared for the 2018 SAFF Championship. On 4 September 2018, it was announced that Dakshinamurthy was selected into the final 20-man squad for the tournament. He then made his international debut for India on 9 September in their last group game against Maldives. He came on as a halftime substitute for Lallianzuala Chhangte as India won 2–0.

Personal life
Daksinamurthy is the nephew of former India international, Shanmugam Venkatesh.

Career statistics

Club

International

Honours

Mumbai City
 Indian Super League: 2020–21
 Indian Super League League Winners Shield: 2020–21

India
 SAFF Championship runner-up: 2018

References

External links 
 Vignesh Dakshinamurthy at Indian Super League

1998 births
Living people
People from Karnataka
Indian footballers
Ozone FC players
Mumbai City FC players
Association football midfielders
Footballers from Karnataka
I-League 2nd Division players
India international footballers
India youth international footballers
Indian Super League players